Karl Arvid Morin-Strom (born June 27, 1952) is a former politician in Ontario, Canada. He served in the Legislative Assembly of Ontario from 1985 to 1990 as a member of the New Democratic Party.

Background
Strom was born in Sault Ste. Marie, Ontario. He attended Sir James Dunn Collegiate and Vocational School. Showing an aptitude for mathematics, he participated in contests provincially and nationally at both the Junior (grades 9-11) and Senior (grades 12-13) levels. He was the first ever winner of the Canadian Mathematical Olympiad in 1969.  He continued his education at Harvard University and the Massachusetts Institute of Technology in Cambridge, receiving a PhD from the latter institution in 1977.  His dissertation was entitled "Witt Theorems for Lattices over Discrete Valuation Rings".  He worked as a corporate planner and financial analyst. In 1972 he married Bernadette Morin and he changed his last name to Morin-Strom. Together they raised three daughters.

Politics
He ran for the federal New Democratic Party in the 1984 election, but lost to Progressive Conservative Jim Kelleher in the Sault Ste. Marie riding by 2,409 votes. The following year, he defeated Progressive Conservative Russ Ramsay in the riding of Sault Ste. Marie in the 1985 Ontario election by 1,069 votes.

Morin-Strom was re-elected in the 1987 election. In 1985 he was appointed as his party's critic for Industry, Trade and Technology.
In 1987 he added critic for Transportation and Financial Institutions to his portfolio. He decided not to run in the 1990 election to protest the Sault Ste. Marie decision that made the city an English language only municipality.

Later life
During his retirement, he has learned German and has extensively travelled Europe.

References

External links
 

1952 births
Canadian people of Swedish descent
Harvard University alumni
Living people
Massachusetts Institute of Technology alumni
Ontario New Democratic Party MPPs
People from Sault Ste. Marie, Ontario